Iuliana Buhuș (born 4 July 1995) is a Romanian rower. She competed in the 2020 Summer Olympics.

References

External links

1995 births
Living people
Rowers at the 2020 Summer Olympics
Romanian female rowers
Olympic rowers of Romania
20th-century Romanian women
21st-century Romanian women
World Rowing Championships medalists for Romania